Note: The following page shows rosters who have won either a domestic or an international cup or championship.

2004–05

Titles
  Estonian Championship (1st)

Roster

2005–06

Titles
  Estonian Cup (1st)
  Estonian Championship (2nd)

Roster

* Only Estonian Cup
** Only Estonian Championship

2006–07

Titles
  Estonian Cup (2nd)

Roster

2007–08

Titles
  Estonian Cup (3rd)

Roster

2008–09

Titles
  Estonian Cup (4th)
  Estonian Championship (3rd)

Roster

* Only Estonian Cup
** Only Estonian Championship

2010–11

Titles
  Estonian Championship (4th)

Roster

2011–12

Titles
  Estonian Championship (5th)

Roster

2012–13

Titles
  Estonian Championship (6th)

Roster

2013–14

Titles
  Estonian Championship (7th)

Roster

2015–16

Titles
  Estonian Cup (5th)
  Estonian Championship (8th)

Roster

* Only Estonian Cup
** Only Estonian Championship

2016–17

Titles
  Estonian Cup (6th)
  Estonian Championship (9th)

Roster

* Only Estonian Cup
** Only Estonian Championship

2017–18

Titles
  Estonian Championship (10th)

Roster

2018–19

Titles
  Estonian Championship (11th)

Roster

2020–21

Titles
  Estonian Cup (7th)
  Estonian Championship (11th)
 Latvian-Estonian League (1st)

Roster

* Estonian Championship and Latvian-Estonian League